Gila Bend Air Force Auxiliary Field  is a United States Air Force auxiliary airfield used as an emergency landing facility by Luke Air Force Base and Davis-Monthan Air Force Base aircraft and units from other nearby bases using the Barry M. Goldwater Air Force Range complex.

Although many U.S. airports use the same three-letter location identifier for the FAA and IATA, this facility is assigned GXF by the FAA but has no designation from the IATA.

History
The facility was opened in July 1942 when it was part of the Gila Bend Gunnery Range. During World War II it was under the command of the 492d (Reduced) Army Air Force Base Unit, AAF West Coast Training Center.  It served as the range headquarters for a massive bombing and gunnery range, now known as the Barry M. Goldwater Range, and for maintenance of the range and range targets.  It remained an active Air Force facility manned by USAF personnel until approximately 1995. It was also used as an auxiliary landing field. As of 2011, this role is handled by private contractors utilizing portions of the facility.

Auxiliary fields to Gila Bend AFAF:

 Gila Bend #6/Williams AAF #4: 
 Gila Bend #6/Williams AAF #5: 
 Gila Bend #6/Williams AAF #6:

Facilities 

See also

 Arizona World War II Army Airfields
 List of United States Air Force installations

References

Other sources

 
 Manning, Thomas A. (2005), History of Air Education and Training Command, 1942–2002. Office of History and Research, Headquarters, AETC, Randolph AFB, Texas  
 Shaw, Frederick J. (2004), Locating Air Force Base Sites, History’s Legacy, Air Force History and Museums Program, United States Air Force, Washington DC.

External links
 56th Range Management Office – operates Gila Bend AFAF

Installations of the United States Air Force in Arizona
Airports in Maricopa County, Arizona
Airfields of the United States Army Air Forces in Arizona
Airports established in 1942
1942 establishments in Arizona